The Victorian College of the Arts (VCA) is the arts school at the University of Melbourne in Australia. It is part of the university's Faculty of Fine Arts and Music. It is located near the Melbourne city centre on the Southbank campus of the university.

Courses and training offered at the VCA cover eight academic disciplines: dance, film and television, drama, Indigenous arts, music theatre, production, theatre, visual art, and writing, alongside the Centre for Ideas and the Wilin Centre for Indigenous Arts and Cultural Development.

The library on the Southbank campus is known as the Lenton Parr Music, Visual and Performing Arts Library.

History
The Victorian College of the Arts was established in 1972 by a government order under the Victorian Institute of Colleges Act 1955, initiated by the Premier of Victoria and Minister for the Arts, Rupert Hamer. Subsequently, in 1973 the VCA was affiliated as a college of advanced education with the Victorian Institute of Colleges. The National Gallery of Victoria Art School, founded in 1867 to teach fine art, was the VCA's foundation school. This was followed by the establishment of the School of Music in 1974, the School of Drama in 1976, the School of Dance in 1978 and Film and Television (1992).

Also in 1978, the Victorian Education Department under the direction of the Deputy Premier and Minister of Education, Lindsay Thompson, established the Victorian College of the Arts Technical School, a government secondary school for dancers and musicians (see VCASS) in close association with the VCA and located on the same campus.

In March 1981, the Minister for the Arts, Norman Lacy, had the Victorian College of the Arts Act passed through the Victorian Parliament. Its purpose was the reconstitution of the Victorian College of the Arts (VCA) made necessary by the repeal in 1980 of the Victorian Institute of Colleges Act and to make it "better able to provide for the preparation of young people to enter upon careers as professional artists. It also represents a most significant development for the Victorian Arts Centre."

Lacy laid out a rationale for the re-constitution of the college under a VCA specific act which was derived firstly "from the quite specific demands and circumstances of preparing young artists for professional practise." He asserted that "the basic concept upon which the college is built is that young artists intending to enter careers as practitioners in their various fields are best assisted to achieve their ambitions in a milieu of continuous artistic activity and endeavour of a fully professional nature. To the extent that artistic education is separated from normal professional practice it is so much less effective." Secondly, the rationale related to the adjacent location of the VCA campus to the National Gallery of Victoria and the Victorian Arts Centre. He said that this "Greater Arts Centre concept is central to the Government's decision to reconstitute the college by separate statute as well as to the development of the arts in general. It represents a simple, readily achievable and highly effective means of creating a substantial milieu of continuous professional activity of the highest standards. It also has ramifications which extend far beyond the college and its partner institutions. Its implementation will shape and invigorate the arts in many ways and lead to a dynamic, cultural and social facility without peer in Australia" and that it "afforded an unparalleled opportunity and challenge to present total programmes in the arts which should encourage creative exchanges between the art forms, give inspiration to students of the arts and provide for the public an experience which few places in the world can match". The government therefore believed that the VCA's role was substantially different from other educational institutions.

On 1 January 1992 further expansion of the college took place when the fine arts programs of the former Faculty of Art and Design, Victoria College (formerly Prahran College of Advanced Education), were incorporated into the School of Art.

At the same point in time in 1992 the Swinburne Film and Television School, established as Australia's first Film school in 1966, also transferred to the VCA. The VCA's School of Film and Television remained at Hawthorn until 1 July 1994, when it moved into a purpose-built federally funded building on the VCA campus at Southbank.

Association with the University of Melbourne
In 2006 the VCA became an affiliated college of the University of Melbourne, and on 1 January 2007 the VCA became known as the Faculty of the Victorian College of the Arts, University of Melbourne. In April 2009 the school became part of the new Faculty of the VCA and Music (VCAM). The School of Music was amalgamated with the University of Melbourne's Faculty of Music and the VCA Secondary School was separated and given a new campus.

With the university requiring the VCA to introduce its Melbourne Model course structure, necessitating a reduction in the amount of hands-on arts training that students receive, critics feared that future students might be unable to find employment upon graduation. Staff of the former VCA accused the dean, Sharman Pretty, of having "little or no recognition of the need for focused arts training, or any esteem for the arts themselves", and the University of Melbourne of trying to mislead the public about the effects. Students were also fearful a reduction in the quality of education and programs on offer whilst the school remained under the University of Melbourne.

In 2014 a $42.5 million project to expand and improve the VCA was announced. Supported chiefly by the Victorian government and The University of Melbourne, the initiative aims to both "ensure that the VCA maintains its high standards in arts training and research" and "open up the campus to the wider community". A portion of the funding is to be spent acquiring and redeveloping the nearby Dodds Street Stables of the Victoria Police mounted branch. Major contributors include the Myer Foundation, the Ian Potter Foundation and Martyn and Louise Myer, their combined donation totalling $10 million.

Deans or heads
The policy of the VCA has always been to enrol only those students who demonstrate the talent and dedication essential for courses as practising artists and performers. Similarly, members of the academic staff, including the director and the dean of each school, have themselves been accomplished and practising artists.

Lenton Parr AM, founding dean, 1972–1975
William Kelly, 1975–1982
John Walker, 1982–1985
Gareth Sansom, 1986–1991
Norman Baggaley, 1991–1997
Mostyn Bramley-Moore, 1997–1999
Su Baker 2000–2010
Barry Conyngham 2010–2021
Marie Sierra 2021-present

Directors
Lenton Parr, 1972–1984 (Victorian College of the Arts proclaimed 30 November 1972)
Lionel Lawrence, 1985–1988
Alwynne Mackie, 1989–1995
Andrea Hull, 1995–2009
Su Baker, 2010–2017
Jon Cattapan, 2017–2020
Barbara Bolt, 2020–2021
Emma Redding 2022-

Notable alumni

References

External links
 

Art schools in Australia
University of Melbourne
Educational institutions established in 1972
1972 establishments in Australia
Buildings and structures in the City of Melbourne (LGA)
Southbank, Victoria